Alvars Rural District is in the Central District of Sareyn County, Ardabil province, Iran. At the census of 2006, its constituent villages were in Ab-e Garm Rural District. There were 4,672 inhabitants in 1,296 households in the newly formed rural district at the following census of 2011, and in the most recent census of 2016, the population was 4,021 in 1,163 households. The largest of its seven villages was Alvars, with 808 people.

References 

Sareyn County

Rural Districts of Ardabil Province

Populated places in Ardabil Province

Populated places in Sareyn County

fa:دهستان الوارس